The Children (also known as The Children of Ravensback) is a 1980 American horror film, directed by  Max Kalmanowicz, and starring Martin Shakar, Gil Rogers, and Gale Garnett. It follows a group of five children in a small New England town when they are transformed into zombies who, after being exposed to waste from a nuclear plant, microwave any living thing they touch. The film received generally negative reviews from critics.

Plot
Jim and Slim, two workers at a chemical plant in the New England town of Ravensback, decide to call it a day and head for the bar. Unfortunately, a large buildup of pressure leaks from one of the pipes that starts to form a yellow toxic cloud that drifts across the ground. Meanwhile, a school bus is taking children home. After dropping one child off, five children are left on the bus.

After Billy Hart, the local sheriff, finds the idling bus abandoned near a cemetery, he radios his deputy and dispatcher. Billy orders a roadblock at the intersection of the main highway and the lone road leading into town, recruiting a couple of armed locals, believing that the children were possibly kidnapped.

While John and Billy are on the road, they encounter Janet Shore standing in the middle of the road, who is dazed like the other zombified children, pale-faced and apparently stunned as they put her in the car to drive her home. It turns out that Janet has not yet fully transformed into a radioactive zombie, but she gradually changes into one during the ride (as evidenced by her fingernails shown turning black). After they stopped, she attacks Sheriff Hart who is able to dodge her while she flees the vicinity.

Eventually, the zombified Ellen, Tommy, and Paul meet and walk together. They are then spotted by the deputy who radios the station, but is soon killed. The three children converge in front of the general store, where the dispatcher comes outside to hug them, but is also roasted to death as her screaming is heard on a police radio dispatcher by John and Billy.

Billy shoots the zombies with his pistol, but the bullets have no effect on them. Cathy, who is still not aware of the children's zombified state, knocks Billy out with a glass object in order to stop him from shooting them. She then finds Clarkie's roasted body and tells John, who runs upstairs and tearfully puts the child's body back to bed.

Paul then attacks the adults, while Billy instinctively picks up a replica katana and chops off both Paul's hands as he howls in pain, which kills Paul as the fingernails on his severed hands revert to normal. Ellen then breaks through one of the windows with one hand, which is immediately severed by Billy and causes her to apparently die. Billy and John then go outside with the sword in hand to find the rest of the zombies. The remaining three zombies, Tommy, Janet and Jenny, converge at the upper level of John's barn where they are found by John and Billy who, despite Jenny's pleas to John, are promptly dismembered and killed.

The next morning, Cathy yells to a still-sleeping John that "it's time". He wakes up and runs frantically into the house to help her deliver their third child. As they are delivering the baby, the camera pans over all of the dead bodies, including Sheriff Hart's (but not Clarkie's). All five of the zombified children are laying down peacefully and hacked up. After the baby is delivered, John is aghast and wide-eyed as he notices that his newborn child has black fingernails while being breastfed by Cathy.

Cast

Release
The Children was given a limited release theatrically in the United States by World Northal, opening regionally in Tucson, Arizona on June 6, 1980. The film had its Los Angeles premiere on September 26, 1980.

Critical response
Upon its theatrical release in 1980 The Children received generally negative reviews. The Los Angeles Times called it a "despicable movie" that "reeks of a nasty, ill-defined dislike of humankind." The Orlando Sentinel deemed the actors "the ugliest bunch of folks we've seen assembled on any screen at any one time." The Pittsburgh Post-Gazette criticized the writing, directing, acting and special effects; the latter slammed for burned bodies looking "exactly like a leftover pepperoni pizza, complete with black olives and anchovies."

Horror film review website Terror Trap awarded the film one and a half out of four stars. Although they called Manfredini's score for the film "somewhat effective", they criticized the film's direction, cast, and low production values. Jonathan Stryker from HorrorNews.net gave the film a slightly positive review, calling it "a predictable, by-the-numbers but somewhat entertaining yarn".

Home media
It was originally released on VHS by Vestron Video in the 1980s. It was later released on VHS by Rhino Home Video on April 11, 1991. The film was released for the first time on DVD in a 25th Anniversary edition by Troma Entertainment on November 8, 2005. It was later released by Videoasia as a part of its five-disk "Grindhouse Experience 20 Film Set" on July 24, 2007. The film was released worldwide December 2018 for the first time ever on Blu-ray by Vinegar Syndrome.

References

External links
 
 
 
 

1980 films
1980 horror films
1980s psychological thriller films
1980s science fiction horror films
1980s supernatural horror films
American independent films
American science fiction horror films
American supernatural horror films
1980 independent films
Films about children
Films about nuclear accidents and incidents
Films scored by Harry Manfredini
Films set in New England
Films shot in Connecticut
Troma Entertainment films
1980s English-language films
1980s American films